Football Club Dimitrovgrad are a Bulgarian association football club based in Dimitrovgrad, Haskovo Province, currently playing in the South-East Third League, the third level of Bulgarian football.

The club's home ground is the Minyor Stadium in Dimitrovgrad, with a capacity of 10,000. Team colours are blue and yellow.

Honours 
Cup of Amateur Football League
Winners (1): 2000–01 (as Siera)
B PFG
Runners-up (2): 1978–79, 1985–86

History 
In 1967, the two former city club rivals, F.C. Himik and F.C. Minyor merged to establish a new club, named Football Club Dimitrovgrad. One of the original clubs, Himik, managed to compete in the A Group, in 1962–63.

In 1986, F.C. Dimitrovgrad qualified for the A PFG for first time in the club's history. The team won just eight games in their first A PFG campaign in 1986–87 season and were relegated, finishing in the last 16th place.

In 2000–01 season F.C. Dimitrovgrad, as F.C. Siera, won the Cup of Amateur Football League.

League positions

Current squad 
As of 1 September 2019

External links 
 
 F.C. Dimitrovgrad at bgclubs.eu

Football clubs in Bulgaria
1947 establishments in Bulgaria
Dimitrovgrad, Bulgaria